The 2022–23 Moldovan Cup is the 32nd season of the annual Moldovan football cup competition. The competition started on 17 August 2022 with the preliminary round. The winners will qualify for the second qualifying round of the 2023–24 UEFA Europa Conference League.

Format and Schedule
In the preliminary round and the first two rounds proper ties are formed on a geographical basis and there is no draw.

Participating clubs
The following teams qualified for the competition:

Preliminary round
8 clubs from the Liga 2 entered this round. Teams that finished higher on the league in the previous season played their ties away. 17 clubs from the Liga 2 received a bye for the preliminary round. Matches were played on 17 August 2022.

First round
21 clubs from the Liga 2 and 11 clubs from the Liga 1 entered this round. In a match, the home advantage was granted to the team from the lower league. If two teams are from the same division, the team that finished higher on the league in the previous season played their tie away. Matches were played on 30, 31 August and 7 September 2022.

Second round
The 16 winners from the previous round entered this round. In a match, the home advantage was granted to the team from the lower league. If two teams are from the same division, the team that finished higher on the league in the previous season played their tie away. Matches were played on 14 September 2022.

Final stage

Bracket

Round of 16
The 8 winners from the previous round and 8 clubs from the Super Liga entered this round. The home teams and the pairs were determined in a draw held on 20 September 2022. Matches were played on 18 and 19 October 2022.

Quarter-finals
The 8 winners from the previous round entered the quarter-finals. The home teams in the first legs were determined in a draw held on 25 October 2022. The first legs were played on 4 and 5 March 2023 and the second legs will be played on 5 April 2023.

|}

First leg

Second leg

References

External links
Cupa Moldovei on Soccerway

Moldovan Cup seasons
Moldova
2022–23 in Moldovan football